An amateur radio satellite is an artificial satellite built and used by amateur radio operators.  It forms part of the Amateur-satellite service.  These satellites use amateur radio frequency allocations to facilitate communication between amateur radio stations.

Many amateur satellites receive an OSCAR designation, which is an acronym for Orbiting Satellite Carrying Amateur Radio. The designation is assigned by AMSAT, an organization which promotes the development and launch of amateur radio satellites.  Because of the prevalence of this designation, amateur radio satellites are often referred to as OSCARs.

These satellites can be used free of charge by licensed amateur radio operators for voice (FM, SSB) and data (AX.25, packet radio, APRS) communications. Currently, over 18 fully operational amateur radio satellites are in orbit. They may be designed to act as repeaters, as linear transponders, and as store and forward digital relays.

Amateur radio satellites have helped advance the science of satellite communications. Contributions include the launch of the first satellite voice transponder (OSCAR 3) and the development of highly advanced digital "store-and-forward" messaging transponder techniques.

The Amateur Radio Satellite community is very active in building satellites and in finding launch opportunities. Lists of functioning satellites need updating regularly, as new satellites are launched and older ones fail. Current information is published by AMSAT. AMSAT has not been actively involved in the launch and operation of most amateur satellites in the last two decades beyond allocating an OSCAR number.

History

OSCAR 1 

The first amateur satellite, simply named OSCAR 1, was launched on December 12, 1961, barely four years after the launch of the world's first satellite, Sputnik I.  The beginning of this project was very humble.  The satellite had to be built in a very specific shape and weight, so it could be used in place of one of the weights necessary for balancing the payload in the rocket stage.  OSCAR 1 was the first satellite to be ejected as a secondary payload (the primary payload was Discoverer 36) and to subsequently enter a separate orbit.  It carried no on-board propulsion and its orbit decayed quickly.  Despite orbiting for only 22 days, OSCAR 1 was an immediate success.  Over 570 amateur radio operators in 28 countries forwarded observations to Project OSCAR.

OSCAR 10 
Most of the components for OSCAR 10 were "off the shelf".  Jan King led the project.  Solar cells were bought in batches of 10 or 20 from Radio Shack, and tested for efficiency by group members.  The most efficient cells were kept for the project; the rest were returned to RadioShack.  Once ready, OSCAR 10 was mounted aboard a private plane, and flown a couple of times to evaluate its performance and reliability.  Special QSL cards were issued to those who participated in the airplane-based tests.  Once it was found to be operative and reliable, the satellite was shipped to Kennedy Space Center, where it was mounted in the launch vehicle's third stage.  OSCAR 10's dimensions were:
Height:   1.35 m (53 in)
Width:    2.0 m (78.75 in)
Weight:   140 kg at launch; 90 kg post engine firings.

Other satellites 

Other programs besides OSCAR have included Iskra (Soviet Union) circa 1982, JAS-1 (Fuji-OSCAR 12) (Japan) in 1986, RS (Soviet Union and Russia), and CubeSats. (There is a list of major amateur satellites in Japanese Wikipedia).

Es’hail 2 / QO-100  Launched November 15, 2018.In geostationary orbit covering Brazil to Thailand.

Narrowband Linear transponder

2400.050 -  2400.300 MHz Uplink

10489.550 - 10489.800 MHz Downlink

Wideband digital transponder

2401.500 -  2409.500 MHz Uplink

10491.000 - 10499.000 MHz Downlink

Hardware 
The first amateur satellites contained telemetry beacons.  Since 1965, most OSCARs carry a linear transponder for two-way communications in real time.  Some satellites have a bulletin board for store-and-forward digital communications, or a digipeater for direct packet radio connections.

Orbits 
Amateur satellites have been launched into low Earth orbits and into highly elliptical orbits.

Operations

Satellite communications 
Currently, amateur satellites support many different types of operation, including FM voice and SSB voice, as well as digital communications of AX.25 FSK (Packet radio) and PSK-31.

Mode designators 

Uplink and downlink designations use sets of paired letters following the structure X/Y where X is the uplink band and Y is the downlink band. Occasionally, the downlink letter is rendered in lower case (i.e., X/y).  With a few exceptions, the letters correspond to IEEE's standard for radar frequency letter bands...

{|class="wikitable"
|-
!Designator
|
|
|
|
|
|
|
|
|
|
|
|-
!Band
|15 m
|10 m
|2 m
|70 cm
|23 cm
|13 cm
|9 cm
|5 cm
|3 cm
|1.2 cm
|6 mm
|-
!Frequency(General)
|21 MHz
|29 MHz
|145 MHz
|435 MHz
|1.2 GHz
|2.4 GHz
|3.4 GHz
|5 GHz
|10 GHz
|24 GHz
|47 GHz
|-
|}

Prior to the launch of OSCAR 40, operating modes were designated using single letters to indicate both uplink and downlink bands.  While deprecated, these older mode designations are still widely used in casual conversation.

Mode A: 2 m uplink / 10 m downlink
Mode B: 70 cm uplink / 2 m downlink
Mode J: 2 m uplink / 70 cm downlink

Doppler shift 
Due to the high orbital speed of the amateur satellites, the uplink and downlink frequencies will vary during the course of a satellite pass.  This phenomenon is known as the Doppler effect.  While the satellite is moving towards the ground station, the downlink frequency will appear to be higher than normal. Hence, the receiver frequency at the ground station must be adjusted higher to continue receiving the satellite.  The satellite in turn, will be receiving the uplink signal at a higher frequency than normal so the ground station's transmitted uplink frequency must be lower to be received by the satellite.  After the satellite passes overhead and begins to move away, this process is reversed.  The downlink frequency will appear lower and the uplink frequency will need to be adjusted higher.  The following mathematical formulas relate the Doppler shift to the velocity of the satellite.

Due to the complexity of finding the relative velocity of the satellite and the speed with which these corrections must be made, these calculations are normally accomplished using satellite tracking software.  Many modern transceivers include a computer interface that allows for automatic doppler effect correction.  Manual frequency-shift correction is possible, but it is difficult to remain precisely near the frequency.  Frequency modulation is more tolerant of doppler shifts than single-sideband, and therefore FM is much easier to tune manually.

FM satellites 

A number of low Earth orbit (LEO) OSCAR satellites use frequency modulation (FM).  These are also commonly referred to as "FM LEOs" or the "FM Birds".  Such satellites act as FM amateur radio repeaters that can be communicated through using commonly available amateur radio equipment.  Communication can be achieved with handheld transceivers using manual doppler correction.  Satellite passes are typically less than 15 minutes long.

Launches

Past launches 
The names of the satellites below are sorted in chronological order by launch date, ascending.  The status column denotes the current operational status of the satellite.  Green signifies that the satellite is currently operational, orange indicates that the satellite is partially operational or failing.  Red indicates that the satellite is non operational and  black indicates that the satellite has re-entered the Earth's atmosphere.  The country listing denotes the country that constructed the satellite and not the launching country.

In development 
KiwiSAT - A microsatellite built by AMSAT-ZL.  Flight-ready, but no launch provider found yet.

Facts

Multinational effort 
Currently, 30 countries have launched an OSCAR satellite.  These countries, in chronological order by date of launch, include:

Related names 
SuitSat, an obsolete Russian space suit with a transmitter aboard, was officially known as "AMSAT-OSCAR 54". Coincidentally, "Oscar" was the name given to an obsolete space suit by its young owner in the 1958 novel Have Space Suit—Will Travel, by Robert A. Heinlein. This book was first published a year after the launch of Sputnik 1, the world's first artificial satellite.

International regulation

Amateur-satellite service (also: amateur-satellite radiocommunication service) is – according to Article 1.57 of the International Telecommunication Union's (ITU) Radio Regulations (RR) – defined as «A radiocommunication service using space stations on earth satellites for the same purposes as those of the amateur service.»

Classification
This radiocommunication service is classified in accordance with ITU Radio Regulations (article 1) as follows: 
Radiocommunication service (article 1.19) 
Amateur service (article 1.56)
Amateur-satellite service (article 1.57)

Frequency allocation
The allocation of radio frequencies is provided according to Article 5 of the ITU Radio Regulations (edition 2012).

In order to improve harmonisation in spectrum utilisation, the majority of service-allocations stipulated in this document were incorporated in national Tables of Frequency Allocations and Utilisations which is within the responsibility of the appropriate national administration. The allocation might be primary, secondary, exclusive, and shared.
primary allocation:  is indicated by writing in capital letters (see example below)
secondary allocation: is indicated by small letters (see example below)
exclusive or shared utilization: is within the responsibility of national administrations

 Example of frequency allocation

Additional allocations

In addition to the formal allocations in the main table such as above, there is also a key ITU-R footnote RR 5.282 that provides for additional allocations:-

5.282 In the bands 435-438 MHz, 1 260-1 270 MHz, 2 400-2 450 MHz, 3 400-3 410 MHz (in Regions 2 and 3 only) 
and 5 650-5 670 MHz, the amateur-satellite service may operate subject to not causing harmful interference to other
services operating in accordance with the Table (see No. 5.43). Administrations authorizing such use shall ensure that
any harmful interference caused by emissions from a station in the amateur-satellite service is immediately eliminated 
in accordance with the provisions of No. 25.11. The use of the bands 1 260-1 270 MHz and 5 650-5 670 MHz by the
amateur-satellite service is limited to the Earth-to-space direction.

Of these, the 435-438 MHz band is particularly popular for amateur/educational small satellites such as Cubesats.

References 

 Martin Davidoff: The Radio Amateur's Satellite Handbook. The American Radio Relay League, Newington, .

Notes

External links 

AMSAT Corporation - a nonprofit corporation that coordinates construction and launch of amateur radio satellites
Project OSCAR - club commemorating the original Project OSCAR group
Work-Sat - Private site with instructions for using amateur radio satellites

Amateur radio
Satellites by type